The Bârsănești (also: Chicera or Gura Văii) is a right tributary of the river Tazlău in Romania.

References

Rivers of Romania
Rivers of Bacău County